Peter Wynhoff (born 29 October 1968 in Berlin) is a German former professional footballer who played as a midfielder. He later became a coach.

Honours
Borussia Mönchengladbach
 DFB-Pokal: 1995; runner-up 1992

References

1968 births
Living people
German footballers
Association football midfielders
Füchse Berlin Reinickendorf players
Borussia Mönchengladbach players
Borussia Mönchengladbach II players
SC Fortuna Köln players
Bundesliga players
Footballers from Berlin
German football managers
West German footballers